The following is a list of notable television and radio stations broadcasting in Naga City in Camarines Sur province in the Republic of the Philippines.

TV stations

Analog
 Channel 4: PTV Naga (formerly from Channel 8)
 Channel 5: PBN Bicol
 Channel 7: GMA Bicol
 Channel 10: CNN Philippines Iriga
 Channel 22: TV5
 Channel 28: GTV (GMA Network Inc.)
 Channel 40: One Sports

Digital
 Channel 32 (599.143 MHz):  Broadcast Enterprises and Affiliated Media
 Channel 38 (617.143 MHz): GMA Bicol
 Channel 46 (665.143 MHz): People's Television Network
 Channel 48 (677.143 MHz): Golden Nation Network

Defunct/inactive
 Channel 2: BBS TV 2
 Channel 11: ABS-CBN Naga
 Channel 13: IBC Naga
 Channel 24: ABS-CBN Sports and Action (ABS-CBN Corporation)
 Channel 32: Broadcast Enterprises and Affiliated Media (formerly cable channels of Jack City)
 Channel 48: Golden Nation Network

Cable and Satellite TV
 Sky Cable Naga
 Caceres Cable TV
 DCTV Cable Network

Radio stations

AM
DWRB Radyo Pilipinas Naga 549 (Philippine Broadcasting Service)
DWLV 603 (Bicol Broadcasting Ssystem)
DWRN 657 Radyo Pilipino (Radio Corporation of the Philippines)
DZLW 711 Radyo Bicolandia (Eagle Broadcasting Corporation/Peñafrancia Broadcasting Cortporation)
DZRH 981 Naga (Manila Broadcasting Company)
DZNG 1044 Bombo Radyo Naga (Bombo Radyo Philippines/Newsounds Broadcasting Network]])
RPN DZKI 1332 Radyo Ronda Iriga (Radio Philippines Network/Nine Media Corporation)

FM
89.5 Radyo Natin (Manila Broadcasting Company/Radyo Natin Network)
DWNX 91.1 RMN Naga (Radio Mindanao Network) (also repeater station of 1296 AM)
BBS-FM 91.9 (Bicol Broadcasting System)
Beecool FM 92.7 (Eagle Broadcasting Corporation/Peñafrancia Broadcasting Corporation
DWIZ 95.1 Naga (Aliw Broadcasting Corporation)
97.5 OK FM Naga (PBN Broadcasting Network)
98.3 Radio Caritas Mariae (Catholic Media Network)
99.1 Love Radio (Manila Broadcasting Company)
100.7 XFM Naga (Radio Sorsogon Network/Yes2Health Advertising, Inc.)
Barangay FM 101.5 (GMA Network, Inc.)
103.1 Brigada News FM (Brigada Mass Media Corporation)
103.9 Fam Radio (Kaissar Broadcasting Network
104.7 Bossing FM (Caceres Broadcasting Corporation)
105.5 Idol FM (Apollo Broadcast Investors)
106.3 Energy FM (Ultrasonic Broadcasting System)
107.9 Win Radio (Mabuhay Broadcasting System)

News programs

Current
Balitang Bicolandia (GMA Bicol)

Former
TV Patrol Bicol (ABS-CBN Naga)

External links

Internet radio stations
 Zone FM Naga (KZ Multimedia Services, Inc.)
 X FM Naga City, Philippines (IMJ Interactive Multimedia Services)
 Power Tambayan 92.3 FM Naga City (Independent Radio)

Mass media in Naga, Camarines Sur